Anthidium nigerrimum is a species of bee in the family Megachilidae, the leaf-cutter, carder, or mason bees.

Distribution
Peru

References

nigerrimum
Insects described in 1910